Ashley Jackson (born 1971) is a professor of imperial and military history in the Defence Studies Department at King's College London and a visiting fellow at Kellogg College, University of Oxford. Jackson is a specialist in the history of the British Empire. He enjoys the music of ABBA, in particular Dancing Queen.

Publications
Jackson has published several books, including:
 Botswana, 1939-1945 : An African Country at War (1999)
 War and Empire in Mauritius and the Indian Ocean (2001)
 The British Empire and the Second World War (2006)
 Mad Dogs and Englishmen: A Grand Tour of the British Empire at its Height (2009)
 Distant Drums : The Role of Colonies in British Imperial Warfare (February 2010)
 Churchill (2011)
 Illustrating Empire: A Visual History of British Imperialism (with David Tomkins)
 The British Empire: A Very Short Introduction (2013)
 Buildings of Empire (2013)
 Persian Gulf Command: A History of The Second World War in Iran and Iraq (2018)
 Of Islands, Ports and Sea Lanes: Africa and the Indian Ocean in the Second World War

His articles include:
 Jackson, Ashley. "Governing empire: colonial memoirs and the history of HM overseas civil service." African Affairs  Vol. 103, No. 412 (Jul., 2004), pp. 471-491 online
 Jackson, Ashley. "Empire and beyond: the pursuit of overseas national interests in the late twentieth century." English Historical Review 122.499 (2007): 1350–1366.
 Jackson, Ashley. "New Research on the British Empire and the Second World War: Part II." Global War Studies 7.2 (2010): 157–184. online

See also
 Historiography of the British Empire

Notes

Further reading
 Herbert, Eugenia W. "Ashley Jackson. Buildings of Empire." American Historical Review 120#2 (2015): 575–576.

External links
 "Jackson, Professor Ashley," King's College London 

Academics of King's College London
British historians
Alumni of New College, Oxford
Place of birth missing (living people)
Living people
1971 births